George W. Miller (November 19, 1922 – October 17, 1997) was an American lawyer and politician from New York.

Life
Miller was born on November 19, 1922, in Rutherfordton, Rutherford County, North Carolina. There he attended the public schools. He graduated from North Carolina Agricultural and Technical State University in 1943. He graduated from Brooklyn Law School in 1955. He practiced law in Harlem, New York City.

Miller was a member of the New York State Assembly from 1971 to 1980, sitting in the 179th, 180th, 181st, 182nd and 183rd New York State Legislatures. He rose to the position of Majority Whip.  In 1980, he ran for re-nomination, but was defeated in the Democratic primary by Geraldine L. Daniels. Miller then ran in the general election on the Republican ticket, but was again defeated by Daniels.

He died on October 17, 1997.

Sources

1922 births
1997 deaths
African-American state legislators in New York (state)
People from Rutherfordton, North Carolina
People from New York City
Democratic Party members of the New York State Assembly
North Carolina A&T State University alumni
Brooklyn Law School alumni
20th-century American politicians
20th-century African-American politicians